Hasan Bakul is a village in Ahmadabad Rural District, in the Central District of Nazarabad County, Alborz Province, Iran. At the 2006 census, its population was 33, in 7 families.

References 

Populated places in Nazarabad County